The 1980 Speedway World Pairs Championship was the eleventh FIM Speedway World Pairs Championship. The final took place at the Matija Gubec Stadium in Krsko, Yugoslavia. The championship was won by England (29 points) who beat Poland (22 points) and Denmark (21 points).

Preliminary round
  Miskolc
 April 27

Semifinal 1
  Olching
 June 5

Semifinal 2
  Czestochowa
 June 8

World final
  Krsko, Matija Gubec Stadium
 June 22

See also
 1980 Individual Speedway World Championship
 1980 Speedway World Team Cup
 motorcycle speedway
 1980 in sports

References

1980
World Pairs